Tour de l'Aude is the name of two cycling races:
Tour de l'Aude (men's race)
Tour de l'Aude Cycliste Féminin